Euptychia sophiae is a species of butterfly in the family Nymphalidae. It is found in western Brazil and in the neighbouring department of Loreto in north-eastern Peru. The habitat consists of submontane dense ombrophilous (very wet) forests.

The length of the forewings is 18–19 mm.

Etymology
The species is named in honour of Thamara Zacca's niece, Laura Sophia.

References

Butterflies described in 2015
Euptychiina
Nymphalidae of South America
Fauna of the Amazon